Mohammed Iqbal Khan is a Pakistani politician who had been a member of the National Assembly of Pakistan from August 2018 till January 2023.

Political career
He was elected to the National Assembly of Pakistan as a candidate of Pakistan Tehreek-e-Insaf (PTI) from Constituency NA-44 (Tribal Area-V) in 2018 Pakistani general election. He received 12,537 votes and defeated Hameed Ullah Jan Afridi.

External links

More Reading
 List of members of the 15th National Assembly of Pakistan

References

Living people
Pakistani MNAs 2018–2023
Year of birth missing (living people)